The Cars were an American rock band formed in Boston in 1976. Emerging from the new wave scene in the late 1970s, they consisted of Ric Ocasek (rhythm guitar), Benjamin Orr (bass guitar), Elliot Easton (lead guitar), Greg Hawkes (keyboards), and David Robinson (drums). Ocasek and Orr shared lead vocals, and Ocasek was the band's principal songwriter and leader.

The Cars were at the forefront of the merger of 1970s guitar-oriented rock with the new synthesizer-oriented pop that became popular in the early 1980s. Robert Palmer, music critic for The New York Times and Rolling Stone, described the Cars' musical style: "They have taken some important but disparate contemporary trends—punk minimalism, the labyrinthine synthesizer and guitar textures of art rock, the '50s rockabilly revival and the melodious terseness of power pop—and mixed them into a personal and appealing blend."

The Cars were named Best New Artist in the 1978 Rolling Stone Readers' Poll. The band's debut album, The Cars, sold six million copies and appeared on the Billboard 200 album chart for 139 weeks. The Cars had four Top 10 hits: "Shake It Up" (1981), "You Might Think" (1984), "Drive" (1984), and "Tonight She Comes" (1985). The band won Video of the Year for "You Might Think" at the first MTV Video Music Awards in 1984. 

The Cars disbanded in 1988. Orr died in 2000 from pancreatic cancer. In 2007, Easton and Hawkes joined Todd Rundgren and others to form the offshoot band The New Cars. The surviving original members of the Cars reunited in 2010 to record the band's seventh and final album, Move Like This, which was released in May 2011. Following a short tour in support of Move Like This, the band once again went on hiatus. In April 2018, the Cars were inducted into the Rock and Roll Hall of Fame and reunited to perform at the induction ceremony. It was the band's final performance with Ocasek, who died on September 15, 2019, of cardiovascular disease.

History

Early years
Before the Cars, members of the band performed together in several different groups. Ric Ocasek and Benjamin Orr met in Cleveland, Ohio, in the 1960s after Ocasek saw Orr performing with his band the Grasshoppers on the Big 5 Show, a local musical variety program. The two were in various bands in Columbus, Ohio and Ann Arbor, Michigan, then moved to Boston in the early 1970s. In Boston, Ocasek and Orr, along with lead guitarist Jas Goodkind, formed a Crosby, Stills and Nash-style folk rock band called Milkwood. In 1972, they released one album, How's the Weather, on Paramount Records, that failed to chart.

After Milkwood, Ocasek and Orr formed the group Richard and the Rabbits, whose name was suggested by Jonathan Richman. The band included Greg Hawkes, who had studied at the Berklee School of Music and had played saxophone on Milkwood's album. Hawkes left to tour with Martin Mull and His Fabulous Furniture, a musical comedy act in which Mull played a variety of instruments. Ric Ocasek and Ben Orr then performed as an acoustic duo called simply Ocasek and Orr at the Idler coffeehouse in Cambridge, Massachusetts. Some of the songs they played became early Cars songs.

Later, Ocasek and Orr teamed with guitarist Elliot Easton (who had also studied at Berklee) in the band Cap'n Swing. Cap'n Swing also featured drummer Glenn Evans, later followed by Kevin Robichaud, and a jazzy bass player, which clashed with Ocasek's more rock-and-roll leanings. Benjamin Orr was the lead vocalist and did not play an instrument. Cap'n Swing soon came to the attention of WBCN disc jockey Maxanne Sartori, who began playing songs from their demo tape on her show.

After being rejected by several record labels, Ocasek got rid of the bass player, keyboardist and drummer and decided to form a band that better fit his style of writing. Orr took over on bass and Robichaud was replaced by David Robinson, best known for his career with the Modern Lovers. Robinson had also played in DMZ and the Pop! Hawkes was contacted to play keyboards and the band became "the Cars", a name suggested by Robinson, whose sense of fashion had a strong influence on the band's image.

The band was formed in 1976.

Rise in popularity, The Cars, and Candy-O (1976–1979)
After a warmup gig in a motel lounge outside of Boston, The Cars played their official first show at Pease Air Force Base in New Hampshire a short time later on December 31, 1976.

Since Greg Hawkes hadn't yet formally joined the group, it was Cap'n Swing's keyboardist, Danny Schliftman (later to join Gov't Mule under the name Danny Louis), who played with the Cars for their first several gigs until Hawkes was free to join in February 1977.

With Hawkes now fully committed, the Cars spent early 1977 playing throughout New England, developing the songs that appeared on their debut album. A nine-song demo tape was recorded in early 1977 and soon "Just What I Needed" was getting heavy airplay on Boston radio stations WBCN and WCOZ. By virtue of that airplay, the band was offered record deals from Arista Records and Elektra Records. The band signed to Elektra, due to its lack of new wave acts, allowing the band to stand out more compared to Arista which had many new wave artists. The band's debut album The Cars was released in June 1978, reaching No. 18 on the Billboard 200. "Just What I Needed" was released as the debut single from the album, followed by "My Best Friend's Girl" and "Good Times Roll", all three charting on the Billboard Hot 100. The album featured multiple album tracks that received substantial airplay, such as "You're All I've Got Tonight", "Bye Bye Love", and "Moving in Stereo".

Released in June 1979, Candy-O, the band's second album, was an even bigger hit peaking at No. 3 on the Billboard 200 album chart, 15 spots higher than their debut. Featuring an album cover created by the famed Playboy artist Alberto Vargas, it featured their first Top-20 single "Let's Go". Follow-up singles "It's All I Can Do" and "Double Life" also were released, but with less success.

Change in sound, Panorama, and Shake It Up (1980–1983)
Following the success of Candy-O, the band's third studio album Panorama was released in 1980. The album, considered more experimental than its predecessors, featured only one top-40 hit with "Touch and Go". Although the album peaked at No. 5 in America, it did not receive the critical praise of The Cars and Candy-O, with Rolling Stone describing the album as "an out-and-out drag".

In 1981, the Cars purchased Intermedia Studios in Boston, renaming it Syncro Sound. The only Cars album recorded there was the band's fourth album Shake It Up, a more commercial album than Panorama. It was their first album to spawn a top-10 single with the title track, and it included another hit in "Since You're Gone". Following their 1982 tour, the Cars took a two year break and went to work on solo projects, with Ocasek and Hawkes both releasing debut albums (Beatitude and Niagara Falls, respectively).

Heartbeat City, Door to Door, superstardom, and first hiatus (1984–1988)
The Cars reunited and released their most successful album, Heartbeat City, in 1984. The first single, "You Might Think", helped the Cars win Video of the Year at the first MTV Video Music Awards. Other hit singles from the album included "Magic", "Hello Again", and "Why Can't I Have You". "Drive", with Orr on lead vocals, gained particular notability when it was used in a video of the Ethiopian famine prepared by the Canadian Broadcasting Corporation and introduced by David Bowie at the 1985 Live Aid concert at Wembley Stadium in London (the Cars themselves performed at the Live Aid concert in Philadelphia). The song subsequently became the band's most successful single, reaching number three on the Billboard Hot 100. Actor/director Timothy Hutton directed the song's music video.

After the resulting period of superstardom and another hit single, "Tonight She Comes", a No. 7 hit on the Billboard Hot 100 and a No. 1 hit on the Billboard Top Rock Tracks chart (their last No. 1), from their Greatest Hits, the Cars took time off again to pursue solo projects. Easton and Orr released their debut albums (Change No Change and The Lace, respectively), while Ocasek released his second solo album, This Side of Paradise. In 1987, the Cars released their sixth album, Door to Door. It contained their last major international hit "You Are the Girl", but the album failed to approach the success of their previous albums. The group announced their breakup in February 1988.

Post break-up, solo careers and death of Benjamin Orr (1989–2009)

In the late 1990s, rumors circulated of a Cars reunion, with nothing to follow after them. However, in 1995 Rhino Records released a two-CD set Just What I Needed: The Cars Anthology, containing all the group's hits mixed with rarities (demos and non-album B-sides). They followed up with the releases of The Cars: Deluxe Edition (1999), their debut album in a two-CD format, and Complete Greatest Hits.

In the mid-1990s, Orr recorded tracks with guitarist John Kalishes for an unreleased follow-up to The Lace and performed with three bands: his own band ORR, the Voices of Classic Rock, and Big People. Orr did appear with his former band mates one last time in an interview for a documentary about the group before his death from pancreatic cancer at age 53 on October 3, 2000.

Ocasek continued to perform as a solo artist, having released over seven studio albums. Robinson retired from music and spent most of his time working in his restaurant. In 2005, Easton and Hawkes combined their talents with Todd Rundgren, Prairie Prince (the Tubes, Journey), and Kasim Sulton (Utopia, Meat Loaf) in a revamped lineup, the New Cars, to perform classic Cars songs along with some new original material and selections from Rundgren's career.

In 2008, the band's first album was released for the video game Rock Band.

Reunion, Move Like This and second hiatus (2010–2017)

In 2010, the founding members of the Cars suggested a reunion when Ric Ocasek, Elliot Easton, Greg Hawkes and David Robinson placed a photo of the four members together in Millbrook Sound Studios, in Millbrook, New York, on their Facebook page. On October 13, they also posted a snippet of a new song, "Blue Tip", on their Facebook page. A picture of Jacknife Lee in the studio was posted on the group's Facebook page hinting that he would be producing the new Cars album.

In October, Billboard reported that the Cars were recording a new album at veteran engineer Paul Orofino's studio in Millbrook, New York. A music clip of the new song "Sad Song" was added to the band's Facebook page on December 7, 2010; another clip of a song called "Free" was shared on their Facebook page on January 1, 2011. The official debut video for "Blue Tip" was released February 17. The video was directed by Roberto Serrini and Eron Otcasek from The Lab NYC and features the four members of the band and NYC-based street artist Joe Iurato. According to Rolling Stone, the surviving Cars mutually agreed there would be no replacing the late Benjamin Orr, so Hawkes and Lee handled all bass parts.

The new album, titled Move Like This, was released on May 10 by Hear Music/Concord Music Group, debuting at No. 7 on Billboards album charts. It featured 10 songs in under 40 minutes. "Sad Song" was released to radio stations on March 1 as the album's first single. In May 2011, the Cars went on a ten-city tour of the United States and Canada and also performed at Lollapalooza in Chicago in August. On the tour, Orr's bass parts were performed by Hawkes on keyboard and bass; the vocals on songs originally sung by Orr ("Just What I Needed", "Let's Go" and "Moving in Stereo") were performed by Ocasek. In an interview, Ocasek was asked whether the band would have reunited if Ben Orr had still been alive. Ocasek responded "Ben and I had a real cold war going that lasted about 23 years. I could never really figure out exactly why, but I think there was a lot of jealousy because I wrote the songs and I got a lot of attention. And there was all kinds of weird stuff, like he said, 'My girlfriend writes songs, let's use one of those or two of those.' I said, 'No, that's not the Cars.'"

The Cars once again became inactive after the tour's conclusion in 2011.

Rock and Roll Hall of Fame induction and death of Ric Ocasek (2018–2019)

After seven years of inactivity, the group reconvened, along with Weezer's Scott Shriner on bass in Orr's stead, to play a four-song set at their 2018 induction into the Rock and Roll Hall of Fame. The band played "You Might Think" (which Weezer covered for the Cars 2 soundtrack, Ocasek also produced three of Weezer's albums), "My Best Friend's Girl", "Moving in Stereo", and "Just What I Needed." They were introduced by Killers frontman Brandon Flowers.

On September 15, 2019, Ocasek was found dead of natural causes in his home in New York at the age of 75.

Musical style
The Cars' music has been described as new wave and power pop, and is influenced by proto-punk, garage rock, and bubblegum pop. They have also used rockabilly in songs such as "My Best Friend's Girl". Robert Palmer, music critic for The New York Times and Rolling Stone, described the Cars' musical style: "they have taken some important but disparate contemporary trends—punk minimalism, the labyrinthine synthesizer and guitar textures of art rock, the 1950s rockabilly revival and the melodious terseness of power pop—and mixed them into a personal and appealing blend."

Band members
Ric Ocasek – lead and backing vocals, rhythm guitar, keyboards 
Elliot Easton – lead guitar, backing vocals 
Benjamin Orr – lead and backing vocals, bass, keyboards 
Greg Hawkes – keyboards, guitars, backing vocals , saxophone , bass 
David Robinson – drums, percussion, backing vocals 

Live members

 Scott Shriner – bass, backing vocals 

Timeline

Discography

 The Cars (1978)
 Candy-O (1979)
 Panorama (1980)
 Shake It Up (1981)
 Heartbeat City (1984)
 Door to Door (1987)
 Move Like This (2011)

References

External links

 
 
 [ AllMusic biography]

 
1976 establishments in Massachusetts
1988 disestablishments in Massachusetts
2010 establishments in Massachusetts
American new wave musical groups
American power pop groups
Concord Records artists
Elektra Records artists
Musical groups established in 1976
Musical groups disestablished in 1988
Musical groups reestablished in 2010
Musical groups reestablished in 2018
Musical groups disestablished in 2011
Musical groups from Boston
Rock music groups from Massachusetts
Musical quintets